In enzymology, an acetoacetate—CoA ligase is an enzyme that catalyzes the chemical reaction

ATP + acetoacetate + CoA  AMP + diphosphate + acetoacetyl-CoA

The 3 substrates of this enzyme are ATP, acetoacetate, and CoA, whereas its 3 products are AMP, diphosphate, and acetoacetyl-CoA.

This enzyme belongs to the family of ligases, specifically those forming carbon-sulfur bonds as acid-thiol ligases.  The systematic name of this enzyme class is acetoacetate:CoA ligase (AMP-forming). This enzyme is also called acetoacetyl-CoA synthetase.  This enzyme participates in butanoate metabolism.

References

 

EC 6.2.1
Enzymes of unknown structure